Jack Clark may refer to:

Jack Clark (baseball) (born 1955), Major League Baseball player
Jack Clark (rugby union), American rugby coach and former rugby union player
Jack Clark (television personality) (1925–1988), American television game show host and announcer
Jack J. Clark (1879–1947), American actor and director
Jack Clark (footballer) (1924–2012), Australian footballer
Jack Clark (cricketer) (born 1994), English cricketer

See also
Jack Clarke (disambiguation)
John Clark (disambiguation)